Tooth loosening may refer to:
Gingival recession, with gradually increased risk of tooth loss
Tooth loss